Ardisia (coralberry or marlberry) is a genus of flowering plants in the family Primulaceae. It was in the former Myrsinaceae family now recognised as the myrsine sub-family Myrsinoideae. They are distributed in the Americas, Asia, Australia, and the Pacific Islands, mainly in the tropics. There are over 700 accepted species. One species, Ardisia japonica is one of the 50 fundamental herbs in traditional Chinese medicine.

These are trees, shrubs, and subshrubs. Most have alternately arranged leaves. Flowers are borne in many forms of inflorescence. The flowers have usually 4 or 5 green sepals and a bell-shaped corolla of usually 4 or 5 white or pink petals. The fruit is a somewhat fleshy drupe. The defining characteristic of the genus is the small tube formed at the center of the flower by the stamens, which are joined at their bases.

Several Ardisia species are the sources of the chemical compounds known as ardisiaquinones.

Species

Selected species include:

References

 
Primulaceae genera
Taxa named by Olof Swartz